Haussner's Restaurant was opened by William Henry Haussner in 1926 and became one of Baltimore's most famous landmarks over the next 73 years.

In addition to 'old-world' style food, including Baltimore's finest crab cakes, the restaurant housed a large collection of fine art, which decorated the walls.

The art had been acquired over the years by William Henry Haussner and Frances Wilke Haussner, who bought their first painting in 1939, "Venetian Flower Vendor," by Eugene de Blaas (1843-1932). Over the next 73 years, the Haussners acquired over 100 pieces, including highly important works by 19th-century European and American masters.

The restaurant was closed in 1999, and the collection, which included pieces from the estates of J.P. Morgan, Cornelius Vanderbilt and Henry Walters, was auctioned by Sotheby's in New York City for $10 million. The restaurant officially served its last meal on Wednesday, October 6, 1999.

The site of the restaurant and its business content was donated to the owner of the former Baltimore International College. In 2011 the site was purchased by Joseph Schultz, owner of Schultz Development LLC, a Baltimore home and rehab company. In 2015, the building was purchased by Garver Development Group. Haussner's was demolished in July 2016 by Access Demolition & Environmental Services. Old Town Construction has constructed a 6-story high rise apartment building in its place.

A reproduction of Haussner's served as the setting in the television show, Mad Men (Series 3, Episode 27).

Links 
Walter Gilliam Chef at Haussners for over forty years.

Frances Wilke Haussner, Matriarch of Restaurant dies at 91

References 

Highlandtown, Baltimore
Restaurants in Baltimore
Restaurants established in 1926
1926 establishments in Maryland
1999 disestablishments in Maryland
Demolished buildings and structures in Baltimore
Buildings and structures demolished in 2016